Dr. Loretta Petit, ABD, also known as "Dr. Lo", is an American radio personality, host of "Voice of the Morning" on Amen 940 WYLD-AM, and an elder and the 2nd Assistant Pastor at Greater St. Stephen Full Gospel Baptist Church in New Orleans, LA.

Early life 
Loretta Ann Petit was born in New Orleans, Louisiana to Helen (née Macklin) and Maurice Petit, Sr., the younger of two children. The family was very poor and moved often. In her book, "Making It Through", Petit recalled:

We must have moved about once every six (6) months. I remember the furnished apartments we moved into. I remember the good and the bad ... It didn't take the teachers long to find out I was a good student, and it certainly didn't take the children long to see I was shy and poverty-stricken and ashamed of my situation ... By the time I was in the sixth grade, I had gone to five schools.

At age 11, Petit moved in with her great-aunt, Rowena Leblanc, and subsequently had a stable residence for the remainder of her formative years.

Radio career

Early career
Petit's start in broadcast radio came about while attending the University of New Orleans. There, she became a student broadcaster with Radio UNO, then hosted by station WTIX in Metairie. At the time, Petit was working full-time in an administrative position with the City of New Orleans, and radio was a side interest.

In July 1989, Petit's mother, Helen Macklin Petit, died from cancer at age 52. Petit took an extended leave of absence from work and eventually resigned. When she finally returned to the work force some months later, Petit switched careers and accepted a part-time on air position working a small gospel radio station, K75.

In 1990, Petit accepted a full-time overnight on air position at gospel radio station WYLD-AM. Within a year, she was promoted to full-time middays, where she developed a community following as the "Midday Messenger". She retained this time slot for many years.

United Broadcasters of New Orleans
Immediately after Hurricane Katrina struck the city of New Orleans in late August 2005, a number of area radio stations, led by WWL-AM, came together in Baton Rouge, LA to form United Broadcasters of New Orleans, a temporary consortium of broadcast personnel, equipment, and other shared resources. Petit was one of a number of broadcasters who helped to provide a continuous 24 hour cycle of news updates and post-Katrina coverage. Louisiana residents, including those still trapped in New Orleans with working radios, could hear the broadcasts via WWL 870-AM. The broadcasts were available outside of Louisiana via streaming services. Petit's show and several others also hosted call ins to help individuals share information about loved ones in hopes of reuniting families.

Present Day
Petit currently hosts the morning drive time show on WYLD-AM, where she also serves as the music and program director. During her 25 years in radio, she has received numerous community awards and was nominated twice for a Stellar Award for gospel music industry professionals. Petit has served as an emcee at countless New Orleans community events, including the annual New Orleans Jazz & Heritage Festival.

Books and other media 
Petit has authored two books: "Making It Through", published in 1996, and "Getting a Grip: Saved, Single, and Sensible, published in 2010.

In 2007, Petit starred as paramedic Barbara Winters in Code 7, a dramatic short film.

In addition, she is the founder of Petit-Kendeka Ministries and the C.O.F.F.E.E. Sisterhood Network.

Ministry 
After pursuing theological studies for a number of years, Petit became an ordained minister in 1997. She is currently the 2nd Assistant Pastor at Greater St. Stephen Full Gospel Baptist Church, of which she has been a member since 1979. She speaks at various churches and events as part of her ministry.

Personal life 
Petit is divorced and has three children: Kenya, Barry (Derren), and Kalilah. She is currently a doctorate student with ABD status at the University of Phoenix.

References

External links 
 Amen 940 WYLD-AM
 Greater St. Stephen Full Gospel Baptist Church

Living people
American radio personalities
Radio personalities from New Orleans
Southern University alumni
Year of birth missing (living people)
University of Phoenix alumni
People from New Orleans
African-American radio personalities
21st-century African-American people